Brooks Ulysses Lawrence (January 30, 1925 – April 27, 2000) was a Major League Baseball All-Star pitcher for the St. Louis Cardinals (1954–1955), Cincinnati Redlegs (1956–1959), and Cincinnati Reds (1960).

Lawrence was born in Springfield, Ohio, and served in the US Army during World War II. He enrolled at Miami University in Oxford, Ohio in 1947, and played two seasons of college baseball before being signed to a professional contract by the Cleveland Indians.

Lawrence's Major League debut came in 1954. As a 29-year-old rookie, Lawrence went 15–6 with a 3.74 ERA while starting and relieving for the St. Louis Cardinals. He struggled in 1955 and was demoted to Oakland (in the Pacific Coast League), but he went 5–1 down the stretch and earned a second chance with the big-league club.

Lawrence's best season came in 1956. Prior to that year, St. Louis sent Lawrence and Sonny Senerchia to the Cincinnati Reds in exchange for Jackie Collum. With the Reds that season, Lawrence posted a 19–10 record and a 3.99 ERA. He opened the season with 13 consecutive wins and earned a spot on the National League All-Star team. That year he led the Reds in wins, innings pitched and shutouts.

Lawrence's career came to a close in 1960, and he retired with an overall record of 69–62 with a 4.25 ERA in  innings pitched. Due largely to his 13-game winning streak and his association with the surprisingly successful 1956 Reds club, Lawrence earned induction into the Cincinnati Reds Hall of Fame in 1976.

After his retirement from baseball, Lawrence worked for International Harvester in his hometown of Springfield, Ohio. He later worked for the Reds in scouting, minor league player development, and radio and television.

Lawrence died on April 27, 2000.

References

External links 

 Brooks Lawrence - Baseballbiography.com
 Historic Baseball - Brooks Lawrence

1925 births
2000 deaths
African-American baseball players
Sportspeople from Springfield, Ohio
Major League Baseball pitchers
St. Louis Cardinals players
Cincinnati Redlegs players
Cincinnati Reds players
National League All-Stars
Miami RedHawks baseball players
Baseball players from Ohio
United States Army personnel of World War II
20th-century African-American sportspeople